(also spelled ) (lit. "sea women") are female divers in the South Korean province of Jeju, whose livelihood consists of harvesting a variety of mollusks, seaweed, and other sea life from the ocean. Known for their independent spirit, iron will and determination,  are representative of the semi-matriarchal family structure of Jeju.

History 
Jeju's diving tradition dates back to 434 AD. Originally, diving was an exclusively male profession, with the exception of women who worked alongside their husbands.

Several possible explanations exist for this shift. For instance, in the 17th century, a significant number of men died at sea due to war or deep-sea fishing accidents, meaning that diving became the work of women. Another explanation is that women tend to have more subcutaneous fat and a higher shivering threshold than men, making them better suited to work in cold waters. An 18th century document records that taxes of dried abalone were imposed on ordinary people, forcing many women to dive in cold waters while pregnant.

As sea diving became a female-dominated industry, many of the  subsequently replaced their husbands as the primary laborer. This trend was especially prominent after the Japanese colonized Korea in 1910 and diving became much more lucrative. Up until this point, much of what the  harvested was given to the Joseon government as tribute. When the Japanese took over, however, they abolished this tradition, allowing  to sell their catch at market and make a profit. Additionally, Japanese and Korean merchants hired  to work for them in Japan and on the Korean mainland as wage-laborers, increasing their financial situations greatly. On Yeonpyeong-ri, an island near Incheon where many  worked, their wages, on average, constituted 40 to 48 percent of a typical family's total income. In the early 1960s, for example,  harvests accounted for 60% of Jeju's fisheries revenue, and 40% of  husbands remained unemployed.

In society
On the tiny islets off the coast of Jeju, such as Mara Island, where sea-diving was the sole source of income, this reversal of traditional gender roles was fully realized; men would look after the children and go shopping while the women would bring in money for the family. Other manifestations of Jeju's unique society include men paying a dowry to the family of the bride (a reversal of the custom on the Korean mainland) and families celebrating the birth of girls over the birth of boys.

While certain elements of a matriarchal society surfaced in Jeju, they were not enough to completely overcome the predominance of Confucianism. As a result, beyond the domestic sphere, little else about Jeju society was different from what existed on the Korean mainland. For example, men filled all political leadership roles and were the only ones who could perform ancestor-worship ceremonies and inherit property and the familial line. Furthermore, during the era of colonial rule,  remained peasants, never moving up the chain to become small-business owners or managers of seafood manufacturing plants. Even in the home, most  remained the primary caregiver and handled at least half of the domestic chores.

Today,  are celebrated as one of Jeju's most valued treasures. Furthermore, in March 2014, the government requested the UNESCO to add  to its Intangible Cultural Heritage list.  were inscribed in UNESCO Intangible Cultural Heritage List from 2016 and enlisted as South Korean Intangible Cultural Property from 2017.

Declining numbers
Like many other historical cultural practices, the sea-diving industry has fallen victim to industrialisation. Beginning in the 1960s, the Korean government sought ways to jumpstart the country's economy in every province. Because Jeju was not a practical place to build factories, the Korean government decided to turn it into an exporter of mandarin oranges. By 1969, a majority of rural workers had joined this new industry. Additionally, about 2% of all land in Jeju was dedicated to farming mandarin oranges. In the 1970s, the government launched another program to bolster Jeju's tourism industry. By 1978, tourism had surpassed agriculture as the island's largest industry.

All of this change had a significant impact on  numbers. Given alternatives to back-breaking labor in miserable conditions, women abandoned the sea-diving industry in droves. In the five years between 1965 and 1970, numbers dropped from 23,081 to 14,143. Even more damning to the  way of life, education opportunities and attractive positions in emerging industries have deterred younger girls from becoming .

Developmental process, gear, diving pattern and harvest
Traditionally, girls started training as  when they were 11 years old. Beginning in shallow water, trainees worked their way up to more challenging depths. After about seven years of training, a girl was considered a "full-fledged" . Today, the oldest  are over 80 years old, and have been diving for more than 66 years.

All together, the tools of a  consist of a wetsuit, diving mask, fins, gloves, chest weights (to assist diving) an L-shaped weeding hoe, and a net attached to a flotation device. The  stash their catch in these nets until they are done for the day.

How long the  spend in the water depends on the season. Before wetsuits were available and all they wore were cotton swimsuits,  could stay in the water for only up to an hour at a time during the winter months. After an hour, they got out of the water and sat by the fire for 3–4 hours to dry off. After this break, they would jump back into the water for another hour. During the summer months, however, they stayed in the water for up to 3 hours at a time before a break. With the introduction of wetsuits,  found they could stay in the water for five to six hours at a time, even during the winter.

Their harvests consist of abalone, conch, octopus, sea urchins, sea squirt, brown alga, top shell, a variety of sargassum, oysters and sea slugs, etc. The divers must contend with dangers such as jellyfish, poor weather and sharks.

Gallery

In popular culture
 My Mother, the Mermaid- 2004 film about a mother (who used to be a ) and her daughter.
 Haenyeo: Women of the Sea- 2013 short film about Chewar Park, a still active 82-year-old  diver. Examining her daily routine as well as her past, Park sheds light on this unique matriarchal culture that has changed little since the 19th century.
 My Neighbor, Charles - 2015, episodes 24, 25, and 26 (documentary TV series); a Japanese immigrant trains to become a 
 Canola- 2016 film starring Youn Yuh-jung as an elderly  (captain of the seawomen).
 Our Blues- 2022 Korean drama series which portrays the work atmosphere between haenyeos of different ages.

 Episode 1 of South Korea: Earth's Hidden Wilderness, BBC 2018, includes a feature on  free-diving for conches, and interviews one said to be aged 94.
White Chrysanthemum, a 2018 novel by Korean-American author Mary Lynn Bracht featuring a  taken as a comfort woman by the Japanese military in World War II.
The Island of Sea Women, a 2019 novel by American author Lisa See, is about the friendship and lives of two  during the Japanese occupation of Korea.
Soft Sounds from Another Planet - 2017 album by Japanese Breakfast which references Jeju-do and uses  as a metaphor, specifically the song "Diving Woman."
Endlings - a 2018/2019 play by Celine Song, which portrays three elderly  and touches on themes of family, immigration, and theater. The play received its debut at Boston's American Repertory Theater in February 2019, with another production at the off-Broadway New York Theatre Workshop in February 2020.
Three Moons of Biyangdo, released in 2022, is a documentary about three sisters Kyung-Mi, Geum-Mi and Jeong-Mi who live on Biyangdo island, off Jeju's island and have been freediving together as haenyeos for the past 25 years. Now in their sixties, they are part of the last of their line. Writer/Director: Lucy McIntosh and Jon Cleave. Producers Jon Cleave and Jay Kim.
In the television adaptation of Pachinko, Kim Sunja works as a haenyeo as a young girl.

See also

References

External links

Fishing in Korea
Culture in Jeju Province
South Korean underwater divers
Gendered occupations
Intangible Cultural Heritage of Humanity
Korean traditions
Important Intangible Cultural Properties of South Korea